Theoperidae is a family of radiolarians in the order Nassellaria.

Genera 
Artopilium — Artostrobus — Bathropyramis — Calocyclas — Clathrocyclas — Conarachnium — Conicavus — Cornutella — Corocalyptra — Cycladophora — Cyrtolagena — Cyrtopera — Dictyocephalus — Dictyoceras — Dictyocodon — Dictyophimus — Eucecryphalus — Eucyrtidium — Gondwanaria — Lipmanella — Litharachnium — Lithocampe — Lithomitra — Lithopera — Lithopilium — Lithostrobus — Lophocorys — Lophocyrtis — Peripyramis — Perypiramis — Phrenocodon — Plectopyramis — Pterocanium — Pterocyrtidium — Sethoconus — Stichocorys — Stichopera — Stichopilidium — Theocalyptra — Theocorys — Theopilium

References

External links 
 
 

Polycystines
Radiolarian families